Cosme García Sáez (born 1818 in Logroño, died in 1874 in Madrid) was a Spanish inventor. It is claimed that he was first to invent a submersible, preceding those of Narciso Monturiol and Isaac Peral. 
He was self-taught without formal training in engineering.
However, three naval submarines (A-3, S-34 and S-83) have been named after him.

See also
Submarine
History of submarines

References

Submarines
1818 births
1874 deaths
Submarine pioneers